The following is a list of events, births, and deaths in 1930 in Switzerland.

Incumbents
Federal Council:
Giuseppe Motta 
Edmund Schulthess 
Jean-Marie Musy (President)
Heinrich Häberlin 
Marcel Pilet-Golaz
Albert Meyer
Rudolf Minger

Tournaments
1929–30 Swiss Serie A
1930–31 Swiss Serie A

Establishments
April 12-FC Wangen bei Olten is founded

Events by Month

January
 Vita Nova, a Swiss publishing house run is established in January 1934.

February

March
March 8-Franz Gertsch, a Swiss painter, is born
March 19-Andreas Walser, a Swiss painter, dies

April
April 6-Swiss alcohol referendum, 1930 is held

May
May 30-Yolande Jobin, a Swiss figure skater, is born

June

July
July 27-Alfred Friedrich Bluntschli, a Swiss architect and educator, dies

August
August 4-Sebastian Gebhard Messmer, a Swiss prelate of the Catholic Church

September
 30 September – Gilbert Albert, jeweler (d. 2019)

October
October 30-Gilbert Rey, a Swiss football (association football) forward, is born

November

December
Eugène Parlier, a Swiss football (association football) goalkeeper, is born

Other
FIBT World Championships 1930 took place in Switzerland
Bank for International Settlements is founded, based in Basel
André Thomkins, a Swiss artist, is born
Solal of the Solals, a Swiss novel, is penned
Heinrich Anton Müller, a Swiss painter, dies

Births
 June 29 – Hans Däscher, Swiss ski jumper

References

 
Years of the 20th century in Switzerland